The 2018–19 Iraq Division One. Al-Qasim won the league and were promoted to the 2019–20 Iraqi Premier League along with Zakho.

Format
Teams from all over Iraq participated in preliminary qualifications for the final stage, which consist of 12 teams split into two groups. The winners of the two groups were promoted.

Elite stage

Group 1
All matches played in Karbala.

Results

Group 2
All matches played in Baghdad.

Results

Final

Others
 2018–19 Iraqi Premier League
 2018–19 Iraq FA Cup

References

External links
 Iraqi Football Website

Iraq Division One seasons
Division One